An initiator can refer to:
 A person who instigates something.
 Modulated neutron initiator, a neutron source used in some nuclear weapons
 Initiator, an Explosive booster
 Initiator, the first Nuclear chain reaction
 Pyrotechnic initiator, a device containing a pyrotechnic composition used primarily to ignite other, more difficult to ignite materials
 Radical initiator, chemical substances that can produce radical species under mild conditions 
 Photoinitiator, chemical substances that produce radical specials upon exposure to light
 SCSI initiator, the host-side endpoint of a SCSI session
 Monomeric polyols, such as glycerin, pentaerythritol, ethylene glycol and sucrose, serving as the starting point for polymeric polyols

Biology 
 Initiator element
 Initiator protein
 Initiation factor

See also
 Initiation (disambiguation)
 Initiate